Gol Darreh-ye Olya (also Romanized as Gol Darreh-ye ‘Olyā) is a village in Sanjabi Rural District, Kuzaran District, Kermanshah County, Kermanshah Province, Iran. At the 2006 census, its population was 55, in 12 families.

References 

Populated places in Kermanshah County